NGC 6027d is a barred spiral galaxy that is strictly a visual member of Seyfert's Sextet, a compact group of galaxies, which is located in the constellation Serpens.  NGC 6027d is not interacting with the other galaxies in the cluster, but is in the background and just happens to be in the same line of sight. The galaxy is nearly 700 million light years away from the interacting group and is believed to be extremely large in size.

See also 
 NGC 6027
 NGC 6027a
 NGC 6027b
 NGC 6027c
 NGC 6027e

References

External links 
 HubbleSite NewsCenter: Pictures and description

Barred spiral galaxies
Serpens (constellation)
6027d
56580
10116 NED05